Callangoan, New South Wales is a bounded rural locality of Coonamble Shire, and a civil parish of Gowen County, a county of New South Wales.

The parish is on the Castlereagh River midway between Gulargambone and Gilgandra.

The main feature of the economy of Callangoan is agriculture.

The parish is on the traditional lands of the Weilwan Aboriginal people.

References

Localities in New South Wales
Geography of New South Wales
Central West (New South Wales)